is a railway station in the town of Kanie, Ama District, Aichi Prefecture, Japan, operated by the private railway operator Kintetsu Railway.

Lines
Tomiyoshi Station is served by the Kintetsu Nagoya Line, and is located  9.7 kilometers from the terminus of the line at Kintetsu Nagoya Station.

Station layout
The station has two island platforms connected to the station building by a level crossing. The station building is located on the north of the tracks (Kuwana side of Nagoya-bound platform).

Platforms

Adjacent stations

Station history
On January 1, 1940, the Sangu Express Railway and the Kansai Express Electric Railway merged and the station was renamed . After merging with Osaka Electric Kido on March 15, 1941, the line became the Kansai Express Railway's Nagoya Line and the station reverted to its original name. This line was merged with the Nankai Electric Railway on June 1, 1944 to form Kintetsu, and the station name became . The name was shortened to its present form on March 1, 1970

Passenger statistics
In fiscal 2017, the station was used by an average of 11,424 passengers daily.

Surrounding area
Kanie Town Hall
Kanie Junior High School
Kanie Eementary School

See also
 List of Railway Stations in Japan

References

External links
 Official web page 

Railway stations in Aichi Prefecture
Stations of Kintetsu Railway
Railway stations in Japan opened in 1938
Kanie, Aichi